WOW Gospel #1s included thirty of the number one gospel songs from the past decade on a double CD album.  The tracks in this collection have all previously appeared on the annual WOW Gospel compilations.  Although not critically well received it still reached number #74 on the Billboard 200 chart in 2007.

Track listing

Disc 1 

Brighter Day - Kirk Franklin - 5:37
Shackles (Praise You) - Mary Mary - 3:15
No, Never - Kierra "KiKi" Sheard - 3:44
Set Me Free - Myron Butler & Levi - 4:12
No Way - Tye Tribbett & Greater Anointing (GA) - 4:08
Heaven Knows - Deitrick Haddon 3:27
You Know Me - George Huff (singer) - 5:01
God Has Not 4Got - Tonéx - 4:36
We Must Praise - J Moss - 5:09
Hallelujah Praise - CeCe Winans - 4:07
Never Seen The Righteous - Donald Lawrence presents The Tri-City Singers - 4:43
Let The Praise Begin (live) - Fred Hammond & Radical for Christ - 4:41
Glorify Him - Darwin Hobbs - 4:05
Shake Yourself Loose - Vickie Winans - 4:46
If We Pray - Anointed - 3:59
The Battle - Hezekiah Walker and The LFT Church Choir - 4:19

Disc 2 

The Blessing Of Abraham - Donald Lawrence presents The Tri-City Singers - 6:04
The Presence Of The Lord - Byron Cage - 6:36
Authority - Karen Clark-Sheard - 5:13
Stand! - Victory in Praise Music and Arts Seminar Mass Choir - 4:06
Helen's Testimony - Helen Baylor - 7:29
We Fall Down - Donnie McClurkin - 4:54
I Almost Let Go - Kurt Carr & The Kurt Carr Singers - 5:41
Healing - Richard Smallwood with Vision - 6:12
I Need You Now - Smokie Norful - 4:11
The Battle Is The Lord's - Yolanda Adams - 4:25
Strong Man - Shirley Caesar - 4:26
So Good To Me - Vanessa Bell Armstrong - 4:28
You Can't Hurry God - Dorinda Clark Cole - 5:25
Strength - The New Life Community Choir featuring John P. Kee - 4:52

References 

WOW series albums
2007 compilation albums
Gospel compilation albums